Terrence Reilly (born 24 October 1947) is an Australian archer. He competed at the 1972 Summer Olympics and the 1976 Summer Olympics.

References

1947 births
Living people
Australian male archers
Olympic archers of Australia
Archers at the 1972 Summer Olympics
Archers at the 1976 Summer Olympics
Place of birth missing (living people)